Alfred Lloyd "Flucie" Stewart (August 5, 1906 – November 17, 1956) was an American basketball and football coach. He served as the head football and basketball coach for the Appalachian State Mountaineers located in the town of Boone in Watauga County, North Carolina. Stewart also was head basketball coach at Furman University for two years.

A native of Strawn, Texas, Stewart attended Furman University where he played as an end on the football team from 1929 to 1930.

He joined the Appalachian State football staff in 1935 as an assistant coach. By 1940, he had taken over as athletic director.

In 1941, he served as head football coach at Tampa for one season before resigning.

Stewart became Maryland head basketball coach in 1947, after the longstanding tenure of Burton Shipley. He was also a member of Jim Tatum's football staff as an assistant coach. Stewart's basketball teams were not successful, however, and after three losing seasons, was replaced by Bud Millikan. He also worked as an associate professor of physical education.

Stewart died on November 17, 1956 in Greenville, South Carolina, succumbing to a two-year illness.

Head coaching record

Football

Basketball

References

External links
 

1906 births
1956 deaths
American football ends
Appalachian State Mountaineers athletic directors
Appalachian State Mountaineers football coaches
Appalachian State Mountaineers men's basketball coaches
Basketball coaches from Texas
Delaware Fightin' Blue Hens football coaches
Delaware Fightin' Blue Hens men's basketball coaches
Furman Paladins football coaches
Furman Paladins football players
Furman Paladins men's basketball coaches
Maryland Terrapins football coaches
Maryland Terrapins men's basketball coaches
People from Palo Pinto County, Texas
Tampa Spartans athletic directors
Tampa Spartans football coaches
University of Maryland, College Park faculty